QIAGEN Silicon Valley (formerly Ingenuity Systems) is a company based in Redwood City, California, USA, that develops software to analyze complex biological systems. QIAGEN Silicon Valley's first product, IPA, was introduced in 2003, and is used to help researchers analyze omics data and model biological systems. The software has been cited in thousands of scientific molecular biology publications and is one of several tools for systems biology researchers and bioinformaticians in drug discovery and institutional research.

Technology
All QIAGEN Silicon Valley products use the Ingenuity Knowledge Base, which contains biological and chemical interactions and functional annotations created from millions of individually modeled relationships between proteins, genes, complexes, cells, tissues, drugs, and diseases.  Each relationship originates from reported experimental facts from primary literature sources, including peer-reviewed journal articles and textbooks.  The knowledge acquisition and extraction process is protected by multiple US Patents.

Products and services

IPA is broadly adopted in the life science community and has been cited in thousands of peer-reviewed journal articles. IPA can be used with or without data. IPA helps researchers analyze data derived from expression and SNP microarrays, proteomics experiments, and small-scale experiments that generate gene lists, in order to gain insight into molecular and chemical interactions, cellular phenotypes, and disease processes within a system. IPA also lets researchers search for information on genes, proteins, chemicals, drugs, and reagents.  Resulting information can be used to build biological models, design experiments, or get up to speed in an area of research.

Ingenuity offers search and visualization tools for science related e-commerce websites.  Ingenuity has two prominent partnerships: Sigma-Aldrich leverages Ingenuity technology in their Your Favorite Gene application, and BD Biosciences leverages Ingenuity technology in their BD Cell Pathways application.

Timeline
2003 - Ingenuity first offers Ingenuity Knowledge Base
2004 - Stanford University licenses IPA
2004 - Independent analysis finds significant ROI for pharmaceutical companies using IPA
2005 - US Food and Drug Administration adopts IPA to review pharmacogenomics submissions
2006 - Ingenuity enters into partnerships with Asuragen, Spotfire, Agilent, Genedata, and Inforsense
2007 - Ingenuity introduces toxicology and biomarker capabilities within IPA 5.0
2007 - IPA 5.0 wins Best in Show - Best New Product at Bio-IT World
2007 - Ingenuity and FDA enter three year collaboration to enhance regulatory review process
2008 - IPA's newest feature, Path Designer, wins Best New Product at Molecular Medicine
2009 - Sigma Aldrich launches Your Favorite Gene - Powered by Ingenuity 
2009 - BD Biosciences launches BD Cell Pathways, powered by Ingenuity
2011 - Ingenuity announces early access to Ingenuity iReport
2012 - Ingenuity announces commercial availability of Ingenuity iReport and Ingenuity Variant Analysis
2013 - Ingenuity announces collaborations with both Laboratory Corporation and Quest Diagnostics to develop a solution for scoring genetic variation for next generation sequencing data (NGS) and is purchased by QIAGEN in May of the same year

See also
 Systems biology
 Bioinformatics
 Computational genomics
 Computational biology
 Microarray analysis
 DNA microarray
 Pathway analysis

References

External links
 ingenuity.com

Software companies based in California
Software companies of the United States